Chang Mian (also Romanized as Chang Mīān; also known as Chang Mīān-e Pā’īn) is a village in Dasht-e Sar Rural District, Dabudasht District, Amol County, Mazandaran Province, Iran. At the 2006 census, its population was 443, in 111 families.

References 

Populated places in Amol County